The Battle of Torna was fought on between the Mughal Empire and the Maratha Empire. Mughal Emperor, Aurangzeb ordered to besiege the fortress of Torna where Mughal Generals, Muhammad Amin Khan Turani and Tarbiyat Khan stormed into Torna and defeated the Marathas. In recognition of the difficult defense the Mughals had to overcome to capture this fort, Aurangzeb renamed it as Futulgaib.

References

Torna
Torna
1704 in India
Torna